Contadina is a brand of Italian-inspired tomato products and bread crumbs. The brand was established in 1914 by Aiello Brothers & Company. The Carnation Company acquired the brand in 1963; Del Monte Foods acquired the brand of canned tomato products and certain other lines from Nestlé (which acquired Carnation in 1985) in December 1997.

Contadina's products include tomato paste, tomato purée, tomato sauce, diced tomatoes, stewed tomatoes, crushed tomatoes, pizza sauce, as well as a few other products.  In the early 1990s, Contadina also sold a "fresh" refrigerated bake-at-home pizza kit in grocery stores, though it received faint praise as "better than frozen", but not as good as a pizzeria pie.

The word Contadina is Italian for "woman of the fields." Contadina products feature an image of young woman in a field.

References

External links 
Contadina

Del Monte Foods brands